Valsad (Pronunciation: [ʋalsɑɖ]) (Gujarati: વલસાડ), historically known as Bulsar, is a city and a municipality in Valsad district of the Indian state of Gujarat. It is the district headquarters of Valsad district. The city of Valsad is located in the south of Navsari and Surat.

Etymology 
The name "Valsad" derives from vad-saal, a Gujarati language compound meaning "covered (saal) by banyan trees (vad)" (the area was naturally rich in banyan trees). During British Raj, it was historically known as "Bulsar".

Geography 
It has an average elevation of 13 metres (42 feet). The old city is about 4 km inland from the Arabian sea.

Climate
Valsad has a tropical savanna climate (Aw) with little to no rainfall from October to May and very heavy to extremely heavy rainfall from June to September when it is under the direct influence of the Arabian Sea branch of the South-west monsoon.

Demographics 

As of the 2011 India census, Valsad (metropolitan area) has a population of 170,060. Males constitute 51% of the population and females 49%. Valsad has an average literacy rate of 91.66%, higher than the national average of 74.04%: male literacy is 94.62%, and female literacy is 88.58%.

The major language spoken is Gujarati. Other languages spoken are Hindi, Marathi and English.

The major religion followed in Valsad is Hinduism. Other religions followed are Islam, Christianity, Jainism, Zoroastrianism and Buddhism.

Transport

Valsad lies on NH 48. Valsad is connected to many cities in Gujarat by the Gujarat State Road Transport Corporation bus service. Valsad is one of the 16 divisions of GSRTC referred as Daman Ganga.

Valsad railway station is managed by the Mumbai WR railway division of the Western Railway and it is a Sub-Division under Western Railway. It lies on the New Delhi–Mumbai main line. The present railway station building was established in 1925. Adjacent to the railway station is the Valsad Electric Loco Shed which houses over 100 electric locomotives.

Valsad is close to Surat International Airport, which is 99 km north of the city, located in Surat. The other airport closer to Valsad is Chhatrapati Shivaji Maharaj International Airport, which is 188.3 km south from the city.

Economy 
Valsad is an industrial base for sectors such as chemicals, textiles, and paper & pulp industries. Since the 1980s, textile and chemicals have been the major sectors of investments and employment in the district. Valsad is emerging as a horticulture hub of the state, witnessing significant production in food grains and crops.

Valsad has 7 industrial estates located in Dungra, Pardi, Dharampur, Bhilad, Valsad, Umbergaon, Sarigam, Vapi (the chemical hub of Gujarat) and 1 Industrial park in Kalgam. With over 300 medium and large scale industries, Vapi is a major industrial center in Valsad. One of Asia's largest Common Effluent Treatment Plant (CETP) is present in Vapi, owned by Vapi Waste & Effluent Management Company and promoted by Vapi Industrial Association.

Education

Colleges
GMERS Medical College, est 2014
Government Engineering College, est 2004
Government Polytechnic, est 1965
Smt. J.P. Shroff Arts College
Shah N.H. Commerce College
Dhiru-Sarla Institute of Management and Commerce
B.K.M. Science College
Dolat-Usha Institute of Applied Sciences
Shree N. K. M. Nursing Instuite
Shah K.M. Law College

Schools
Affiliated with ICSE
Atul Vidyalaya School

Affiliated with the CBSE
 Saraswati International School
 Shree Vallabh Ashram's MGM Amin & V N Savani International School
 Shree Vallabh Sanskar Dham's Smt. Shobhaben Pratapbhai Patel Day Boarding School
 Shree Vallabh Ashram's MCM Kothari Girl's Residential School
 Western Railway English Medium Secondary School

Affiliated with the GSHSEB
 D.M.D.G. Municipal High School
 Jamnabai Sarvajanik Kanya Vidyalaya
 Maniba Sarvajanik Vidyalaya
 Shah Khimchand Mulji Sarvajanik High School
 St. Joseph's English Teaching High School 
 Mother Mary Public High school.
 Bai Ava Bai High School
 BAPS Swaminarayan Vidhyamandir
 G.V.D. Sarvajanik High School
 Sett Rustomjee Jamsetjee Jejeebhoy or Sett R.J.J High School
 R.M. & V.M. Desai Vidyalaya
 Swaminarayan High School
 Gayatri High School
 Kusum Vidyalaya
 C.B High school
Shree I P Gandhi sarvajanik madhyamik Shala Jujva

Tourist Attraction 

Tithal Beach is located near Tithal town. The sand of the beach is black sand. Tithal Beach Festival and International Kite Festival are also organized on the shore of the beach.

Shree Shirdi Saibaba Sansthapan is located on the shore of the beach in Tithal town of Valsad district. The temple was established in 1982.

Shri Swaminarayan Mandir is located on the shore of the beach in Tithal town of Valsad district. This is a temple of Lord Swami Narayan.

Shantidham Aradhana Kendra in Tithal is a meditation centre.

Tadkeshwar Mahadev Temple is a temple of Lord Shiva located in Abrama. This temple is more than 800 years old.

Morarji Desai Museum is built to dedicate former 5th Prime Minister of India, Morarji Desai in Valsad. The museum was developed by Valsad municipality at a cost of Rs. 4 crore. The museum was inaugurated by former Chief Minister of Gujarat, Anandiben Patel.

Callian Baug is an urban park in Valsad. In 1929, Mr. Motilal Callianji presented a donation for park to Valsad Municipality in memory of his father. In 1931, Callian Baug was opened by J.H.Garrett.

Notable people
 Bhulabhai Desai - freedom fighter and acclaimed lawyer.
 Bindu Desai - Hindi film actress.
 Dadabhoy Havewala - first-class cricketer, who played for Bombay cricket team and Parsees cricket team.
 Freddie Mercury (born Farrokh Bulsara) - singer and songwriter for the British rock band Queen, whose family originated from Valsad.
 Hemin Desai - Indian-born cricketer, who has represented Oman at the List A cricket.
 Makarand Dave - Gujarati poet.
 Manilal Desai - Gujarati poet.
 Morarji Desai - former Prime Minister of India.
 Nagindas Parekh - literary critic, editor and translator.
 Nanubhai Vakil - a Hindi and Gujarati film director.
 Narayan Desai - Gujarati author.
 Nirupa Roy - Hindi film actress.
 Pooja Jhaveri - Telugu, Tamil and Kannada film actress.
 Pramodkumar Patel - literary critic.
 Pratap Save - a social activist.
 Ravindra Parekh - a writer, novelist, poet, critic and translator.
 Rex Sellers - a former Indian-Australian cricketer.
 Sam Manekshaw - First Field Marshal of India and former chief of army staff, India. His family hailed from Valsad, later moved to Bombay and then Amritsar.
 Sam Balsara - Indian advertising executive.
 Sangeita Chauhan - Indian film and television actress.
 Sheela Sharma - Hindi and Gujarati film actress.
 Ushnas - Gujarati poet.

See also
Bulsara
Balsara
Gulf of Khambhat
Tithal Beach
Vapi
Navsari
Khambhat
Bharuch

References

External links

 Official website of the Valsad Nagarpalika.
Official website of the Valsad Collectorate (in Gujarati).

 
Cities and towns in Valsad district